This is a list of electoral results for the electoral district of Chillagoe in Queensland state elections.

Members for Chillagoe

Election results

Elections in the 1920s

Elections in the 1910s

References

Queensland state electoral results by district